Action Party may refer to:

Action Party (Italy)
Action Party (Italy, 1848)
Action Party (Morocco)
Action Party (UK)
Canadian Action Party
Guyana Action Party
Liberian Action Party
Sardinian Action Party
ActionSA